Armando Baptista-Bastos (born and died Lisbon, Portugal; 27 February 1933 – 9 May 2017) was a Portuguese journalist and writer.

Baptista-Bastos' mother died when he was young. His father, a printer by trade, influenced his interest in journalism and writing. Baptista-Bastos also studied French at the Liceu Francês Charles Lepierre.

Portuguese journalists
Male journalists
1933 births
2017 deaths